Primorje-Gorski Kotar County is a county in western Croatia that includes the Bay of Kvarner, the surrounding Northern Croatian Littoral, and the mountainous region of Gorski kotar. Its center is Rijeka. The county's population was 296,195 at the 2011 census.

The county includes the island territories of Krk, Cres, Lošinj and Rab.

The county is divided:

 City of Rijeka (county seat)
 Town of Bakar
 Town of Cres
 Town of Crikvenica
 Town of Čabar
 Town of Delnice
 Town of Kastav
 Town of Kraljevica
 Town of Krk
 Town of Mali Lošinj
 Town of Novi Vinodolski
 Town of Opatija
 Town of Rab
 Town of Vrbovsko
 Municipality of Baška
 Municipality of Brod Moravice
 Municipality of Čavle
 Municipality of Dobrinj
 Municipality of Fužine
 Municipality of Jelenje
 Municipality of Klana
 Municipality of Kostrena
 Municipality of Lokve
 Municipality of Lovran
 Municipality of Malinska-Dubašnica
 Municipality of Matulji
 Municipality of Mošćenička Draga
 Municipality of Mrkopalj
 Municipality of Omišalj
 Municipality of Punat
 Municipality of Ravna Gora
 Municipality of Skrad
 Municipality of Vinodol
 Municipality of Viškovo
 Municipality of Vrbnik
 Municipality of Lopar

Demographics

According to the 2011 census, Primorje-Gorski Kotar County has a population of 296,195. 

Ethnic Croats make up the majority with 86.3% of the population, followed by Serbs at 5.0% and Italians 1,16%.

Protected areas
 Risnjak National Park
 Učka

Gallery

See also 
 Modruš-Rijeka County of the Kingdom of Croatia-Slavonia

References

External links
 

 
Counties of Croatia